The description person of faith (plural: people of faith) refers to any person who can be delineated or classified by an adherence to a religious tradition or doctrine, as opposed to those who do not publicly identify or in any way espouse a religious path.

The term people of faith has been increasingly used in the twentieth and twenty-first century by religious adherents in Westernized countries who are critical of a perceived increase in public disenchantment or de-emphasis upon accommodation for religious adherents, although the term itself is used more as a catch-all term which is intentionally non-denominational or non-specific to any particular religious path.  A person of faith is said to belong to a faith community or faith-based community.

The term is also criticized by advocates of nontheistic positions for being inaccurate in its assumption of an underlying, unifying commonality between all religious observants - despite stark doctrinal differences and oppositional stances - simply for the purpose of reducing the influence of secular-minded individuals (similar to the term person of color as a catch-all descriptor of non-white people, or the Islamic description of people of the Book to describe the communities of adherents to Islam, Christianity, and Judaism).

Persian term (in Islam)

In Islam, there is a Persian term called اهل ایمان, which literally means "people of faith". It is first founded in the Persian translation of the Quran by Mirza Mahdi Elahi Ghomshei (1901 - 1973) based on the following example below:

.ای اهل ایمان ، روزی حلال و پاکیزه‌ای که ما نصیب شما کرده‌ایم بخورید و شکر خدا به جای آرید اگر شما خالص خدا را می‌پرستید

Meaning: O people of faith, eat the lawful and pure foods which We have bestowed upon you, and be grateful to Allah if you sincerely worship Him.

Source: Quran, Surah al-Baqarah, verse 172

References

Neologisms
Religious identity